Congregation of the Heart of Mary is a name that applies to various Roman Catholic religious Congregations, most of them for women.

The Daughters of the Immaculate Heart of Mary took that name as an association of ladies in charge of the home for incurables at Rennes, on their organization into a religious community in 1841. The home had been in existence since 1700, had withstood the rigours of the Revolution, and had never been without a band of devoted women, bound only by the ties of charity, and tacitly rendering obedience to the oldest of their number.
The Sisters of the Holy Heart of Mary were founded in 1842 at Nancy, by Alexis-Basile-Alexandre Menjaud, later Bishop of Nancy and Toul, for the purpose of instructing young girls in various trades, and protecting their virtue. The statutes, drawn up by the Abbé Masson, provide that the congregation shall own nothing but the houses which they occupy; that everything over and above shall go to the maintenance of poor children and the decoration of altars. The devotion of Perpetual Adoration was instituted in the mother-house.
The Sisters of the Immaculate Heart of Mary (IHM), founded as the Daughters of the Most Holy and Immaculate Heart of the Blessed Virgin Mary, is a Catholic religious teaching institute for women, founded in Spain in 1848 by Father Joaquim Masmitjà i de Puig as a means of rebuilding society through the education of young women. A daughter house of the community was founded in Los Angeles, California, USA, in 1871, and in 1924 formally separated from the Spanish congregation and was established as a distinct institute in its own right.
The Sister-Servants of the Holy Heart of Mary were founded at Paris, in 1860, by Père Delaplace, and Marie-Jeanne Moisan, for the Christian education of children, and the visitation and care of the sick in hospitals and in their own homes. This congregation is particularly flourishing in Canada, where about 140 sisters have charge of about 2500 children. There are six communities in the United States.
The Daughters of the Holy Heart of Mary were founded by Mgr. Kobès, at Dakar, Senegal on 24 May 1858, for native women. In touch as they are with the customs and dialects of their country, they render invaluable services in teaching, visiting various mission stations, caring for the sick, and preparing catechumens for baptism. Their immunity from yellow fever enabled them to care for the Europeans stricken during epidemics. In the Vicariate of Senegambia were six communities with about forty sisters.
The Congregation of the Holy and Immaculate Heart of Mary was founded, at the desire of the Synod of Pondicherry, by Père Dupuis for the Christian education of young Indian girls. The native prejudice against the education of their women was gradually overcome and the congregation took charge of orphanages, pharmacies and schools. Most of the sisters have government certificates of proficiency in the various grades.
The Sisters of the Holy and Immaculate Heart of Mary were founded in July, 1848, at Pico Heights, Los Angeles, California, U.S.A. In the Diocese of Monterey and Los Angeles the sisters number about 110, and have charge of about 700 children and 60 orphans, in 1 college, 5 academies, and 1 orphan asylum.
The Sister-Servants of the Immaculate Heart of Mary were founded at Quebec in 1859 by Mgr Turgeon, Archbishop of Quebec, and Mme Marie Roy, in religion Sister Marie du Sacré-Coeur (d. 1885), to shelter penitent girls, and provide Christian education for children. The congregation now numbers about 400 members in the United States and Canada in charge of 26 establishments, 152 penitents, and about 5500 children.
The Sisters, Servants of the Immaculate Heart of Mary were founded at Monroe, Michigan, U.S.A. on 28 November 1845 by the Rev. Louis Gillet, C.SS.R., for the work of teaching. In 1856 an independent mother-house was established at Villa Maria, Westchester County, Pennsylvania, and later a third at Scranton, Pennsylvania. The congregation took charge of academies, normal schools, parochial schools and asylums in eleven dioceses, and number about 1200 sisters.
The Missionary Sons of the Immaculate Heart of Mary or Claretians were founded at Vic, Catalonia, in 1848, by Saint Anthony Mary Claret (d. 1870). They took charge of a mission on Fernando Po, and stations at Corisco and Annobón in Western Africa.
The Congregation of the Immaculate Heart of Mary, also called the Congregation of Scheutveld, was founded in 1862 by Theophiel Verbist (d. 1865), a former military chaplain, for mission work, especially in China. The congregation in the early 20th century numbered over 300 members in charge of the Vicariates Apostolic of Central, Eastern and South-Western Mongolia, and in China the Vicariate of Northern Kan-su and the Prefecture Apostolic of Southern Kan-su, where in all about 155 Fathers have charge of about 51,600 Catholics, 20,000 catechumens, 250 churches and chapels, and 263 schools, with an attendance of 6000; in Africa, in the Vicariate Apostolic of Belgian Congo and the Prefecture Apostolic of Upper Kassai, 52 priests and 20 lay brothers are over about 15,000 Catholics, 29,300 catechumens, 38 churches and chapels and 28 schools, attended by 2300 children.
The  were founded at Vienna, in 1843, by Barbara Maix (d. 1873), and in 1848 established in Brazil, where, in addition to the mother-house at Porto Alegre, they have institutions elsewhere, chiefly orphan asylums.
The Sisters of the Sacred Heart of Mary were founded in 1848 by Jean Gailhac at Béziers in the Diocese of Montpellier, for the work of teaching and the care of orphans. They were approved by Pius IX and Leo XIII and started institutions in Ireland, England, Portugal and the United States.

References

Catholic orders and societies
Organisation of Catholic religious orders